Victor Hopkins (July 19, 1904 – December 8, 1969) was an American cyclist. He competed in two events at the 1924 Summer Olympics. He also won the US Pro Championship in 1926.

References

External links
 

1904 births
1969 deaths
American male cyclists
Olympic cyclists of the United States
Cyclists at the 1924 Summer Olympics
Sportspeople from Cedar Rapids, Iowa